This page lists the Golden Bell Award winners from 1970 to 1979.

1970 (6th Golden Bell Awards)

1971 (7th Golden Bell Awards)

1972 (8th Golden Bell Awards)

1973 (9th Golden Bell Awards)

1974 (10th Golden Bell Awards)

1975 (11th Golden Bell Awards)

1976 (12th Golden Bell Awards)

1977 (13th Golden Bell Awards)

1978 (14th Golden Bell Awards)

1979
14th Golden Bell Awards

See also
Golden Bell Awards
List of Taiwanese television series

References
"精華區 - 閱讀文章".PTT. Retrieved 2013-08-02.

External links
 Golden Bell Awards: 1970-1979 winners list on Chinese Wikipedia

Television series, List of
 
Taiwanese television awards